Summit Lake is a lake in geographic Shenango Township in the Unorganized North Part of Sudbury District in Northeastern Ontario, Canada.

Hydrology
There are two unnamed creeks as inflows, at the south and northeast tips of the lake. The primary outflow is Shiners Creek, towards Shiners Lake, at the northwest corner of the lake, which eventually flows via the Nemegosenda River, Kapuskasing River, Mattagami River and Moose River into James Bay.

References

Other map sources:

Lakes of Sudbury District